Valera is an unincorporated community and Census Designated Place in Coleman County, Texas, United States.

The Panther Creek Consolidated Independent School District serves area students, and is about 8 miles south on FM 503.  As of 2020, it has a population of 177 in 72 households.

Demographics

2020 census

As of the 2020 United States census, there were 94 people, 30 households, and 30 families residing in the CDP.

References

Unincorporated communities in Texas
Unincorporated communities in Coleman County, Texas